Gracilentulus gracilis is a species of proturan in the family Acerentomidae. It is found in Africa, Australia, Europe, and Northern Asia (excluding China).

References

Further reading

 

Protura
Articles created by Qbugbot
Animals described in 1908